The Roman Catholic Diocese of San Felipe is a diocese located in the city of San Felipe in the Ecclesiastical province of Barquisimeto in Venezuela.

History
On 7 October 1966 Pope Paul VI established as Diocese of San Felipe from the Metropolitan Archdiocese of Barquisimeto and Diocese of Valencia.

Ordinaries
Tomás Enrique Márquez Gómez (1966.11.30 – 1992.02.29)
Nelson Antonio Martínez Rust (1992.02.29 – 2016.03.11)
Victor Hugo Basabe (2016.03.11 – Present)

See also
 Roman Catholicism in Venezuela

References

External links
 GCatholic.org
 Catholic Hierarchy 

Roman Catholic dioceses in Venezuela
Roman Catholic Ecclesiastical Province of Barquisimeto
Christian organizations established in 1966
Roman Catholic dioceses and prelatures established in the 20th century
1966 establishments in Venezuela
San Felipe, Yaracuy